The R.S.C. Anderlecht rugby section is a Belgian rugby union club from the Brussels municipality of Anderlecht.

History 
The club was founded on 21 September 1931 by players of the Rugby Club Français shortly before the creation of the Belgian Rugby Federation. In 1935 it became the rugby section of the R.S.C. Anderlecht. It is the oldest rugby club in Belgium and the most successful.

Seniors 
The men play competitively in matches every Sunday afternoon between September and May in the Belgian National Second Division. The ladies play every Saturday in the Belgian National Second Division.

Honours 
 Belgian League Champions (20): 1939, 1946, 1947, 1948, 1949, 1949, 1951, 1952, 1953, 1954, 1955, 1956, 1958, 1959, 1964, 1966, 1970, 1971, 1972 & 1974
 Belgian Cup Champions (0): finalist in 1976 & 1988

External links
 Official website

Belgian rugby union clubs
Rugby union in Belgium
Anderlecht